Incendiary means "capable of causing fire". It may also refer to:
 Incendiary device, a device designed to cause fires
 Incendiary ammunition, a projectile designed to set fire to a target
 Incendiary (novel), a novel by Chris Cleave
 Incendiary (film), a 2008 film based on the Cleave novel
 Incendiary:  The Willingham Case, a 2011 documentary film about the Cameron Todd Willingham arson murder case
 Incendiary (band), a hardcore punk band from Long Island, New York

See also
Arson, a crime of willfully and maliciously setting fire to or charring property